Justinian (Justin) Jampol is the founder and current executive director of The Wende Museum of the Cold War, an art museum, historical archive, and educational institution in Culver City, California. His work focuses on visual cultural studies and the connection between contemporary art and Cold War iconography. He is also the host and consulting producer of the Travel Channel series Lost Secrets.

Early life and education
Jampol was born in Los Angeles, California in 1978. He graduated from the University of California, Los Angeles in 2000 with a B.A. in History. Jampol attended graduate school at Oxford University where he received a Master of Philosophy in Russian and East European Studies, and a Doctor of Philosophy in Modern History. In addition to his leadership role at The Wende Museum, Jampol is adjunct professor at Claremont Graduate University and a frequent commentator on art as well as East European and Russian design.

Career
In 2002, at the age of 24, Jampol founded The Wende Museum (“Wende” is a German word that means transition or change) while studying visual culture at Oxford University. Since opening, the museum has become the largest collection of Cold War era artifacts and artwork outside of Europe.

The Wende Museum is known for its large-scale and often provocative installations. In 2009, in honor of the 20th anniversary of the fall of the Berlin Wall, Jampol brought ten segments (24 tons) of the original Wall from Germany, and placed them along Wilshire Boulevard in Los Angeles, directly across the street from LACMA. At midnight on November 9, 2009, thousands of Angelenos blocked the street to celebrate the monument, which was painted by notable graffiti artists such as Shepard Fairey, RETNA, Heraku, Thierry Noir, and D*Face.

In 2013, Jampol's contribution to Jeremy Deller's UK Pavilion at the Venice Biennale sparked controversy through its implication of Russian oligarchs in the corrupt process of privatization following the collapse of the USSR. In 2014, further controversy followed with the publication of a New York Times Op-Ed article written by Jampol on the political crisis in Ukraine and the destruction of Soviet statues.

In summer 2014, Jampol co-curated Competing Utopias at the Neutra VDL House in Silver Lake, California, installing three floors of modernist Eastern Bloc design in the former home of California-based architect Richard Neutra. The show was #3 in Hyperallergic's annual "Top Ten Exhibitions Across the United States."

In fall 2015, Jampol guest-edited a special supplement of The Art Newspaper on Los Angeles art.

As Executive Director of the Wende Museum, Jampol oversaw the museum's relocation to a former United States National Guard Armory building in Culver City. A 75-year lease of the armory site was unanimously approved by the City Council of Culver City in November 2012. After renovations, the Wende Museum reopened to the public in its new location in November 2017 with an inaugural exhibition titled Cold War Spaces.

In December 2019, Foreign Policy published an article written by Jampol titled "Why the Berlin Wall Still Matters."

In January 2020, Jampol was appointed as the Los Angeles Chapter President of the Heidelberg Club International.

Jampol's writing has been featured in The Atlantic, Foreign Policy, Frankfurter Allgemeine Zeitung, Los Angeles Times, The New York Times, and The Times of London.

He is a "Notable Alumnus" of UCLA.

Film and TV production 
Jampol has produced several films about the Cold War and is a frequent guest on various Travel Channel programs, including Hotel Secrets & Legends (2014) and Mysteries at the Museum (2014).

From 2015–2018, he was a guest historian on the Cooking Channel program Food: Fact or Fiction? narrated by Michael McKean.

Jampol is the host and consulting producer of the Travel Channel program Lost Secrets, a six-part series that premiered on November 10, 2019.

Publications 
In 2014, Jampol published a 904-page encyclopedia of the Wende Museum's East German collection titled Beyond the Wall: Art and Artifacts from the GDR. The book was produced by Benedikt Taschen and published by Taschen Books. It received an overwhelmingly positive review in the New York Times Sunday Book Review. The book was launched on November 9, 2014 to coincide with the 25th anniversary of the fall of the Berlin Wall.

In 2019, a smaller second edition of the book, The East German Handbook, was published with text in both English and German.

Personal life
Jampol is married to actress and Wilhelmina model, Filomena Lovin. His brother-in-law is Australian tennis professional Mark Philippoussis.

References

External links 

The Wende Museum Official Website

Beyond the Wall Taschen Books
The East German Handbook Taschen Books
Drinks With... Justin Jampol Featured on Zócalo Public Square
 A turning point for Wende Museum of the Cold War A conversation/podcast with KCRW
 Adding Mystery to History Justin Jampol launches "Lost Secrets" on the Travel Channel

University of California, Los Angeles alumni
1978 births
Living people
People from Los Angeles
Historians from California